George Panayi (born 31 July 1988) is a Canadian media personality. He is known for being the host and executive producer of Meet Me For Coffee: The Podcast. He is also known as George Rock.

Meet Me For Coffee is quickly becoming one of the world's hottest podcasts. The show is rated as one of the top 50 shows globally by the New York Daily Times, outranking The Daily Show With Trevor Noah and The Adam Corolla Show. Meet Me For Coffee host George Panayi brings over a decade of broadcast experience to the table with a passion for excellence. His unique, personable interview style has led him to feature in The New York Times, Blabbermouth, along with various significant media outlets across North America. Due to his devotion to captivating content, Hollywood Digest has rewarded George with the Most Vivacious Host Award. This podcast has featured the world's most fascinating people from your favorite films and shows on Netflix, HBO, Amazon Prime, Hulu, Disney +. George also dives in with Music legends from Pink Floyd, Megadeth, and Jane's Addiction and successful entrepreneurs. Meet Me For Coffee is a chilled atmosphere, where you can intimately get to know your favorite people! 

He launched the show in 2020, after retiring from hosting The World Rock Countdown. George is credited with discovering many new talented musicians from all over the world. The World Rock Countdown, was a groundbreaking show for the music and podcast industry as it pioneered the transition of radio into the fusion that is the space called podcasting.

The show came to an end, but was never fully put to rest with rumours of its return in the future.

References

External links
 www.meetmeforcoffee.co 
 www.fb.com/mmfcpodcast

1997 births
Living people
English cricketers
Warwickshire cricketers
People from Enfield, London
Cricketers from Greater London